Bad Cop/Bad Cop is an American pop punk band from Southern California, United States. They are currently under contract with Fat Wreck Chords.

History
Bassist Jen Carlson founded the band in January 2011 together with her longtime colleague Stacey Dee (vocals / guitar) as well as Myra Gallarza (drums) and Jennie Cotterill (vocals / guitar). The band name is an allusion to the idiom "Good Cop, Bad Cop". The band initially started touring locally and expanded their reach to the East coast of the United States. In 2012 the first  demo Get Rad appeared, followed by a self-titled 7’’. Carlson left the band shortly after the recordings, but introduced the group to their successor Linh Le.

Having recorded, since then, their EPs independently in 2013 Dee convinced friend Fat Mike to come to see the band perform at the Lilith Bear Womyn's Festival in San Francisco. He signed them within a week on his label Fat Wreck Chords and released the EP Boss Lady. Their debut album Not Sorry was released in June 2015. The band was allowed to play on Fat Wreck's subsequent 25th Anniversary Tour. But about half of the tour had problems connected with Stacey Dee's drug addiction led the band to have to leave the tour. Fat Mike supported Stacey Dee in her recovery and the band claims to have grown closer going through this experience.

After overcoming this negative moment, the band start recording their second album Warriors  in which Fat Mike was involved as a producer together with Warsop and also contributed to some ideas. The album finally appeared in June 2017, exactly two years after their debut album. The band then took part in the  Vans Warped Tour. For the European Tour 2019 of Me First and the Gimme Gimmes Stacey Dee filled in for Joey Cape on few dates. The band released their third full-length album via Fat Wreck Chords in June 2020, entitled The Ride.

Members
Current members
 Stacey Dee – guitar, vocals (2011–present)
 Jennie Cotterill – guitar, vocals (2011–present)
 Linh Le – bass, backing vocals, occasional lead vocals (2013–present)
 Myra Gallarza – drums, backing vocals (2011–present)

Former members
 Jen Carlson – bass (2011–2013)

Timeline

Discography

Studio albums
 Not Sorry  (2015)
 Warriors  (2017)
 The Ride  (2020)

EPs
 Get Rad (2012)
 Bad Cop/Bad Cop (2013)
 Boss Lady (2014)
 Don (2016)

Compilation appearances
 Fat Music Vol. 8 - Going Nowhere Fat (2015 - Fat Wreck Chords)

References

External links
 Official website
 Fat Wreck Chords Artist page

All-female punk bands
Fat Wreck Chords artists
Musical groups established in 2011
Punk rock groups from California
Skate punk groups
Pop punk groups from California
2011 establishments in California